Avalanche Canyon is located in Grand Teton National Park, in the U. S. state of Wyoming. The canyon was formed by glaciers which retreated at the end of the last glacial maximum approximately 15,000 years ago, leaving behind a U-shaped valley. To the north of Avalanche Canyon lies South Teton, Cloudveil Dome and Nez Perce Peak while to the southwest lie Mount Wister and Veiled Peak. Snowdrift Lake and Lake Taminah are situated at the head of the canyon.

See also
Canyons of the Teton Range
Geology of the Grand Teton area

References

Canyons and gorges of Wyoming
Canyons and gorges of Grand Teton National Park